North Bluff is a summit in the U.S. state of Wisconsin.

North Bluff was so named on account of its location relative to nearby South Bluff.

References

Landforms of Wood County, Wisconsin
Mountains of Wisconsin